The R686 road is a regional road in Ireland, located in Waterford City. It runs roughly north–south, to the west of the inner city.

The route begins at the junction of the R680 at Merchants Quay and runs via Bridge Street, Summerhill, Military Road, Morrisson's Road, Cannon Street, Ashe Road, Inner Ring Road and rejoins the R680 at Kingsmeadow Roundabout on Cork Road, all in the city of Waterford.

See also
Roads in Ireland

References
Roads Act 1993 (Classification of Regional Roads) Order 2006 – Department of Transport

Regional roads in the Republic of Ireland
Roads in County Waterford